Greta Hofer may refer to:
 Greta Hofer (opera singer)
 Greta Hofer (model)